Philophthalmus lacrimosus is a species of trematodes in the  family Philophthalmidae.

Life cycle
Philophthalmus lacrimosus, as adults, parasitize the eyes of birds (definitive host). Eggs containing miracidia hatch in the water, miracidia penetrate snails (intermediate hosts) and develop into redia and cercariae. When the metacercariae encyst on surfaces of food for birds the infection of a new definitive host can take place by entering the eye or by oral intake.

Human infections
Human cases of philophthalmosis have been reported in Yugoslavia, Israel, Asia (Thailand, Sri Lanka, Japan) and the Americas, specifically in Mexico and the United States.

References
This article incorporates CC-BY-2.0 text from the reference

External links 
  An image of Philophthalmus lacrimosus

Plagiorchiida
Animals described in 1902